Solute carrier family 22 member 24 is a protein that in humans is encoded by the SLC22A24 gene.

Function

SLC22A24 belongs to a large family of transmembrane proteins that function as uniporters, symporters, and antiporters to transport organic ions across cell membranes (Jacobsson et al., 2007 [PubMed 17714910]).

References

Further reading 

Human proteins